Gutow may refer to:

 Gutow, Rostock, a municipality in Mecklenburg-Vorpommern, Germany
 Steve Gutow, a rabbi, lawyer, community activist, and Jewish leader

See also
 Gutów (disambiguation)
 Gutowo (disambiguation)